Jharkhand Vidhi Mahavidyalaya or JMV is a private law school situated beside Ashram Road at Jhumri Talaiya in Koderma District in the Indian state of Jharkhand. The college offers five-years integrated LL.B., and three-years LL.B. course approved by the Bar Council of India (BCI), New Delhi and affiliated to Vinoba Bhave University of Hazaribag.

History 
Jharkhand Vidhi Mahavidyalaya was established by Si Koderma Society in 2003 at Jhumri Talaiya.

References

Law schools in Jharkhand
Universities and colleges in Jharkhand
Educational institutions established in 2003
2003 establishments in Jharkhand
Colleges affiliated to Vinoba Bhave University